Darwin Deez is the self-titled debut album by New York City-born indie rock singer-songwriter Darwin Deez. It was available in the United Kingdom on 12 April 2010 on CD, digital download and vinyl through the record label Lucky Number. On 27 April 2010 it was available to import to the United States.

The album reached No. 61 in the UK Albums Chart, as well as No. 3 in the UK Indie Chart. Darwin Deez has toured all over the world promoting the album, mainly staying in the United Kingdom. He has played over 200 gigs in 18 months, including gigs at BBC Radio 1's student tours in Newcastle and Lincoln, as well as playing to a sell-out crowd at London's Shepherd's Bush Empire, his biggest gig to date.

Track listing

Singles

References

2010 debut albums